Henry William Moore (October 9, 1876 – September 2, 1917) was an American baseball utility player in the pre-Negro leagues. He was known as "Harry Moore," "Henry Moore," or "Mike Moore."

Biography
Born in Detroit, Michigan, on October 9, 1876, Moore moved with his parents William and Julia to Chicago in 1889 and began playing baseball professionally in 1894.

In 1894, Moore played left field for the Chicago Unions and played that position for two seasons. He moved to first base in 1896 and pitched part of the season in 1897.

Moore went back to the outfield for the 1898, 1899, and 1900 seasons. Then, he moved to the Columbia Giants in 1901.

In 1902 and 1903, Moore played for Iowa's Algona Brownies. In 1904 he played center field for the Cuban X-Giants of New York City. Moore moved to the Philadelphia Giants in 1905 and helped them win a league championship, and he stayed with Philadelphia through the end of the 1906 season.

Moore played with the Leland Giants in 1907, playing all positions for three seasons. Sportswriter and fellow player Jimmy Smith put Moore on his 1909 "All American Team."

Moore played for Chicago teams Chicago Giants and Leland Giants almost exclusively for the rest of his baseball career, with exception of part of a season he played for the French Lick, Indiana Plutos in 1913.

Moore died at the age of 40 in Chicago of what the coroner called "Pulmonary Tuberculosis." Moore is buried at the Mount Glenwood Cemetery in Thornton, Illinois. Researchers working with the Negro Leagues Baseball Grave Marker Project have attempted to find Moore's gravesite, but its location has not yet been discovered.

References

External links

1876 births
1917 deaths
20th-century African-American people
20th-century deaths from tuberculosis
Algona Brownies players
Chicago Giants players
Chicago Unions players
Columbia Giants players
Cuban X-Giants players
French Lick Plutos players
Leland Giants players
Lincoln Giants players
Philadelphia Giants players
Baseball players from Detroit
Tuberculosis deaths in Illinois